Nonceveux is a village of Wallonia in the municipality of Aywaille, district of Sougné-Remouchamps, located in the province of Liège, Belgium.

Geography
The village is situated inside a meander of the Amblève. Nonceveux is located on the left bank, six kilometres south-east and upstream of Sougné-Remouchamps.

Description
Nonceveux, located in the Ardennes, attracts campers throughout the year. It has several camping grounds, both on the Amblève's left bank near the village, as well as on the right bank, which is more downstream. 

The chapel that became the Saint Teresa of Avila church was built in 1790.

Hiking route GR 571 crosses the village. 

Aywaille
Populated places in Liège Province